Ali Dashti is an Iranian midfielder who currently plays for an Iranian football club, Gol Gohar Sirjan in the Persian Gulf Pro League.

Club career statistics

References

1994 births
Living people
Paykan F.C. players
Pars Jonoubi Jam players
Association football forwards
Iranian footballers
Esteghlal F.C. players

https://int.soccerway.com/players/ali-dashti/429136/